The Hockey collégial féminin RSEQ is an amateur women's ice hockey league in Quebec, Canada. The former name of the League was Ligue de hockey féminin collégial AA. In autumn 2011, the names of different Leagues by letters AA and A within the Quebec Student Sports Federation are changed. The Hockey collégial féminin RSEQ is considered to be the highest level of young women's ice hockey in the Quebec collegiate system. The league has a wide range of talent from pre-university programs and is sanctioned by Hockey Quebec (Fédération québécoise de hockey sur glace) and the Quebec Student Sports Federation.

The Hockey Collégial féminin RSEQ is a development league serving as springboard towards the university women's ice hockey and afterward towards the professional level.

History
Prior to the existence of the League, some collegial teams played with university teams in the Quebec University Women's Hockey League (QSSF). The first-ever Canadian Interuniversity Athletic Union (CIAU) National title for women's ice hockey was held at the end of the 1997-98 CIAU season and two Québécois college teams participated at the tournament: Cégep St-Laurent and Collège Jean-de-Brébeuf. The Ligue de hockey féminin collégial AA was founded in 1999 to provide opportunities for young females to develop into collegiate student-athletes. It was developed to bring together teams that regularly produce players for competition at the Canadian Interuniversity Sport women's ice hockey championship and NCAA National Collegiate Women's Ice Hockey Championship levels, respectively. The inaugural season was in 1999-2000, and the Patriotes du collège St-Laurent won the Playoff Championship title. A national championship for college athletics in Canada was approved at the advent of the 2001-02 season.

Current teams
The Hockey collégial féminin RSEQ consists of 8 college teams:
 Cheminots du Cégep St-Jérôme, localized in St-Jérôme.
 Dragons du Collège Laflèche, localized in Trois-Rivières.
 Dawson College Blues, localized in the west of downtown Montreal.
 John Abbott Islanders, localized in Sainte-Anne-de-Bellevue in Montreal's West Island.
 Lynx du Collège Édouard-Montpetit, localized in Longueuil
 Nordiques du Collège Lionel-Groulx, localized in Sainte-Thérèse
 Patriotes du Cégep St-Laurent, localized in Montreal
 Titans du Cégep Limoilou, localized in Limoilou a borough of Quebec City.

Former teams
 Collège Jean-de-Brébeuf, localized in Montreal.
 Faucons du Cégep de Lévis-Lauzon (close in 2010) localized in Lévis, near Quebec city.
 Trappeurs du Cégep Marie-Victorin (close in 2008) localized in Montreal.

Expansion
The league has ambitions to expand from 8 teams to up to 10 teams for the 2012-13 season. The two proposed teams to be added are:
 Cougars du Collège Champlain localized in Lennoxville.
 Pionniers du Cégep de Rimouski localized in Rimouski.

Championship regular season

The team that claims the regular season championship does so by accumulating the best won-loss record in a season consisting of 21 matches:

 2011-12 – Titans du Cégep Limoilou
 2010-11 – Lynx du Collège Édouard-Montpetit
 2009-10 – Lynx du Collège Édouard-Montpetit
 2008-09 – Dawson College Blues
 2007-08 – Cheminots du Cégep St-Jérôme
 2006-07 – Dawson College Blues
 2005-06 – Cheminots du Cégep du St-Jérôme
 2004-05 – Patriotes du Cégep St-Laurent
 2003-04 – Non-available
 2002-03 – Non-available
 2001-02 – Titans du Cégep Limoilou
 2000-01 – Non-available
 1999-2000 – Non-available

Championship playoff 
Following the regular season, a playoff is held to determine the Collégial women's champion in Quebec. A list of collégial winners includes (winner is in bold):

Playoff 2011-12

First round

Semi-finals and Championship Final game 2011-12

Playoff 2010-11

The semi-finals and the finals was presented at the Centre Étienne Desmarteau
winner: Patriotes du Cégep St-Laurent

Playoff 2009-10

Semi-finals and Championship Final game 2010
winner: Lynx du Collège Édouard-Montpetit

Playoffs 2008-09

Semi-finals and Championship Final game 
winner:Lynx du Collège Édouard-Montpetit

Playoffs 2007-08

Championship final games 
winner:Cheminots du Cégep St-Jérôme

Playoffs 2006-07

Championship final games 
winner:Dawson Blues

Playoffs 2005-06

Championship final games 
winner:Cheminots du cégep St-Jérôme

Playoffs 2004-2005

Championship final game 
winner:Cheminots du cégep St-Jérôme

 Playoff 2003-04 – Non-available
 Playoff 2002-03 – Non-available
 Playoff 2001-02 – Titans du Cégep Limoilou
 Playoff 2000-01 – Non-available
 Playoff 1999-2000 – Patriotes du Collège St-Laurent

International matches
 August 30, 2010 – Norway women national team vs Dragons du Collège Laflèche
 August 28 and 29, 2010 – Norway women national team vs Titans du Cégep Limoilou

Scoring leaders

Individual statistics are not available for the other seasons.

Goaltending Leaders

Individual statistics are not available for the other seasons.

Awards and honors

Season 2011-12 
 Player of the Year Award:
 Rookie of the Year Award:
 Fair-play Award:

Season 2010-11 
 Player of the Year Award: Mélodie Daoust, Lynx du Collège Édouard-Montpetit.
 Rookie of the Year Award: Cassandra Poudrier, Dawson Blues.
 Fair-play Award: Emmanuelle Dumont, Dragons du Collège Laflèche

 Season 2009-10
 Player of the Year Award: Josianne Legault, Dragons du Collège Laflèche
 Rookie of the Year Award: Mélodie Daoust, Lynx du Édouard-Montpetit
 Fair-play Award: Emmanuelle Dumont, Dragons du Collège Laflèche

 Season 2008-09
 Player of the Year Award: Marie-Philip Poulin, Dawson Blues
 Rookie of the Year Award: Marie-Philip Poulin, Dawson Blues
 Fair-play Award: Katia Clément-Heydra, Lynx du Collège Édouard-Montpetit

Awards and individual honors are not available for the other seasons.

Notable players
 Catherine Ward, (Dawson Blues) – McGill Martlets and Canada National women Team.
 Marie-Philip Poulin, (Dawson Blues) – Canada National women Team.
 Ann-Sophie Bettez, (Dawson Blues) – McGill Martlets and Canada's national women's under-22 team.
 Lauriane Rougeau, (Cheminots du Cegep St-Jérôme and Dawson Blues) – Montreal Stars (CWHL), Canada's National women's team Under-18 team and Canada's national women's under-22 team.
 Emmanuelle Blais, (Dawson Blues) – Montreal Stars (CWHL).
 Marie-Andrée Leclerc-Auger, (Cheminots du Cegep St-Jérôme) – McGill Martlets and Montreal Carabins
 Kelly Sudia, (John Abbott Islanders) – Concordia Stingers, Montreal Stars (CWHL).
 Donna Ringrose, (John Abbott Islanders) – Concordia Stingers, Montreal Stars (CWHL).
 Tawnya Danis, (John Abbott Islanders) – Concordia Stingers, Montreal Stars (CWHL).
 Josée-Ann Deschênes, (Cheminots du Cegep St-Jérôme) – Montreal Carabins and Montreal Stars (CWHL).
 Mélodie Daoust, (Lynx du College Edouard-Montpetit) – McGill Martlets Canada's National women's team Under-18 team.
 Roxanne Douville, (Lynx du Collège Édouard-Montpetit) – Vermont Catamounts and Canada's national women's under-22 team.
 Katia Clément-Heydra (Lynx du Collège Édouard-Montpetit), McGill Martlets
 Janique Duval (Lynx du Collège Édouard-Montpetit), Montreal Carabins
 Ariane Barker, (Lynx du Collège Édouard-Montpetit) – Montreal Carabins
 Maude Gélinas, (Lynx du Collège Édouard-Montpetit) – Montreal Carabins

References

External links
 (French) Official League Website
 (French) Results and Statistics website

Teams websites
 Dawson Blues
 John Abbott Islanders
 (French) Dragons du Collège Laflèche
 (French) Lynx du Collège Édouard-Montpetit
 (French) Patriotes du Cégep St-Laurent
 (French) Titans du Cegep Limoilou

See also
 Hockey Québec
 Quebec Student Sports Federation
 Coupe Dodge
 Dawson College Blues women's ice hockey
 Lynx du Collège Édouard-Montpetit women's ice hockey
 Titans du Cégep Limoilou women's ice hockey

3
Ice hockey in Quebec
Amateur ice hockey
Youth ice hockey leagues in Canada
Hockey Quebec